Wedding at Lake Wolfgang (German: Hochzeit am Wolfgangsee) is a 1933 German musical film directed by Hans Behrendt and starring Hugo Schrader, Gustl Gstettenbaur and Oskar Sima. Made at the end of the Weimar Republic it had release problems due to Nazi objections to the film's Jewish director.

The film's sets were designed by the art director Hermann Warm. It was shot at the Halensee Studios in Berlin with location shooting in the German capital and at Lake Wolfgang in Austria.

Cast
 Hugo Schrader as Hans Leitner, Besitzer des "Posthof"
 Gustl Gstettenbaur as Peterl, sein jüngerer Bruder
 Rose Stradner as Rosl
 Hansi Niese as Vevi
 Oskar Sima as Sebastian Hupfinger, Zuckerbäcker aus Wien
 Gerhard Ritterband as Gustav, sein Lehrjunge
 Hans Junkermann as Mr.Williams, Revuedirektor
 Max Gülstorff as Van Molden, sein Finanzier
 Else Elster as Mary, Williams' Tochter
 Eduard von Winterstein  as Bürgermeister von St. Wolfgang
 Oscar Sabo as Der Landarzt
 Jack Hammer as Singer

References

Bibliography
 Bock, Hans-Michael & Bergfelder, Tim. The Concise Cinegraph: Encyclopaedia of German Cinema. Berghahn Books, 2009.
 Klaus, Ulrich J. Deutsche Tonfilme: Jahrgang 1933. Klaus-Archiv, 1988.

External links

1933 films
1933 musical films
German musical films
Films of the Weimar Republic
1930s German-language films
Films directed by Hans Behrendt
Films set in Austria
Films shot in Austria
German black-and-white films
1930s German films
Films shot at Halensee Studios